Sovtorgflot ("Soviet Commercial Fleet") was a shipping company in the Soviet Union. It was established as a joint-stock company on July 18, 1924. It united ships which belonged to different narkomats and companies, including the ones with foreign capital.

The entire Soviet commercial fleet was subordinated to the war effort following Nazi Germany's invasion of the USSR in June 1941.

References

See also
Dobrolyot

Shipping companies of the Soviet Union
Transport companies established in 1924
1924 establishments in the Soviet Union
Transport companies disestablished in 1941
1941 disestablishments in the Soviet Union